Mohammad Reza Tahmasebi (born 21 March 1976) is an Iranian retired Football player who currently coaches Paykan of the Iran Pro League.

Club career
Since 2006, Tahmasebi has played for  Paykan and is currently the captain of his team.

Club career statistics
Last update 8 October 2014

 Assist Goals

I
I

References

1976 births
Living people
Iranian footballers
Persian Gulf Pro League players
Azadegan League players
Zob Ahan Esfahan F.C. players
Saipa F.C. players
Paykan F.C. players
Shahrdari Tabriz players
Association football midfielders